Everton Sousa Soares (born 22 March 1996), usually known as just Everton or Everton Cebolinha ("Jimmy Five" in Portuguese), is a Brazilian professional footballer who plays as a forward for Campeonato Brasileiro Série A club Flamengo and the Brazil national team.

Club career
Everton was born in Maracanaú, Ceará, and joined Grêmio's youth setup in 2012, from Fortaleza. Initially on loan, he signed a permanent contract in October 2013, whilst also being linked to Manchester City in the process.

Promoted to the main squad by Enderson Moreira ahead of the 2014 season, Everton made his first team debut on 19 January of that year, coming on as a second-half substitute for Yuri Mamute in a 1–0 Campeonato Gaúcho away loss against São José-PA. His first goal came on four days later, as he scored the first goal in a 2–1 home win against Lajeadense.

Everton made his Série A debut on 20 April 2014, replacing Pará in a 1–0 away loss against Athletico Paranaense. Rarely used during the tournament, he started to feature more regularly during the 2015 campaign, scoring his first goal in the top tier on 6 September in a 2–1 home success over Goiás.

On 15 August 2016, Everton renewed his contract with Grêmio until 2020. On 23 November, in the first leg of the 2016 Copa do Brasil Finals, he came on as a late substitute for Douglas and scored the 3rd goal in a 3–1 away win against Atlético Mineiro; he was a starter in the second leg, a 1–1 home draw which granted the title to Grêmio.

Everton played his 100th match for Grêmio on 9 March 2017, after coming on for Pedro Rocha in a 2–0 Copa Libertadores away win against Zamora FC.

Benfica
On 14 August 2020, Everton signed for Portuguese side Benfica on a five-year deal.

Flamengo
On 15 June 2022, Everton returned to Brazil and signed for Flamengo.

International career

On 17 August 2018, Everton was called up by coach Tite for friendly matches against United States, and El Salvador. Thus, Everton was in the first list of Brazil after the 2018 FIFA World Cup.

In May 2019, he was included in Brazil's 23-man squad for the 2019 Copa América on home soil. He scored his first ever international goal in Brazil's opening game of the tournament, netting the final goal in a 3–0 win against Bolivia on 15 June. Seven days later, Everton scored his second international goal against Peru, in Brazil's final group stage match, firing in a shot at the near post from outside the box; the match ended in a 5–0 victory to Brazil, which enabled the hosts to advance to the quarter-finals of the tournament.

In the 2019 Copa América Final on 7 July, at the Maracanã Stadium, Everton scored the opening goal in an eventual 3–1 win over Peru, and was named Man of the Match; he also finished the tournament as the top scorer with 3 goals, alongside Peru's Paolo Guerrero, but won the Golden Boot Award due to having played fewer minutes than the Peruvian throughout the tournament.

In June 2021, he was included in Brazil's squad for the 2021 Copa América on home soil.

Everton Soares was not drafted to play the 2022 World Cup in Qatar, however, he still hopes to be drafted for the 2026 World Cup based on his performance in Flamengo.

Personal life

Nickname 
Everton got the nickname Cebola (Onion in Portuguese) from his Grêmio teammate Pará, however, with the arrival of Uruguayan new transfer Cristian Rodríguez, who's also known as Cebolla, Everton came to be called Cebolinha in reference to the cartoon character Jimmy Five (Cebolinha in Brazil), of Monica's Gang.

Career statistics

Club

International

International goals
Scores and results list Brazil's goal tally first, score column indicates score after each Everton goal.

Honours
Grêmio
Copa do Brasil: 2016
Copa Libertadores: 2017
Recopa Sudamericana: 2018
Campeonato Gaúcho: 2018, 2019, 2020

Flamengo
 Copa do Brasil: 2022
Copa Libertadores: 2022

Brazil
Copa América: 2019

Individual
Bola de Prata: 2018
Copa América Golden Boot: 2019
Copa América Team of the Tournament: 2019

References

External links

 

1996 births
Living people
Sportspeople from Ceará
Brazilian footballers
Brazil international footballers
Association football forwards
Grêmio Foot-Ball Porto Alegrense players
S.L. Benfica footballers
CR Flamengo footballers
Campeonato Brasileiro Série A players
Primeira Liga players
2019 Copa América players
2021 Copa América players
Copa América-winning players
 Copa Libertadores-winning players
Brazilian expatriate footballers
Brazilian expatriate sportspeople in Portugal
Expatriate footballers in Portugal